Nocte is a Northern Naga language of northeastern India. Alternate names include Borduria, Jaipuria, Mohongia, Namsangia, Nocte, Nokte, and Paniduria (Ethnologue).

Dialects
 Bote Naga
 Hakhi Naga
 Hakhun
 Hame Naga
 Hasik Naga
 Hathim Naga
 Khapa
 Laju (Ollo Naga)
 Lama Naga

Geographical distribution
According to Ethnologue, Nocte is spoken in the following locations.

Khonsa, Namsang, and Laju circles of Tirap district, southeastern Arunachal Pradesh
Changlang district, southeastern Arunachal Pradesh
Jaipur, Lakhimpur district, Assam

References

Languages of Assam
Languages of Arunachal Pradesh
Languages of Nagaland
Sal languages
Endangered languages of India